Bruno Ravel (born May 1, 1964) is a bassist and guitarist, best known for playing in the band Danger Danger in which he is the main composer.

Before Danger Danger, Ravel was in the band Hotshot, along with original Danger Danger lead vocalist Mike Pont and Danger Danger drummer Steve West. Ravel originally played with White Lion but was frustrated by a lack of compositional input.

In Danger Danger, Ravel started out as a bassist, but after the departure of guitarist Andy Timmons, he also played guitar for a while. Guitarist Rob Marcello has since taken up the guitar spot in Danger Danger.

Ravel guested as a backing vocalist on Warrant's Cherry Pie album.

He also guested on TNT's All the Way to the Sun and My Religion. In 1998, Ravel played in the 1998 tour with German singer Nena. One show from the tour is available on CD, Nena Live (Polydor).

Ravel had a side band, Westworld which released four albums between 1998 and 2002.

American heavy metal guitarists
American heavy metal bass guitarists
American male bass guitarists
Danger Danger members
Living people
1964 births
American male guitarists
20th-century American guitarists
White Lion members